NTN Buzztime is a company that produces interactive entertainment across many different platforms.  Its most well-known product, simply called Buzztime, and formerly known as the NTN Network, since 1985,  broadcasts trivia and other games via broadband over a national network to over 3,800 bars and restaurants in the United States, Canada and the Caribbean.  Operations in the UK were discontinued in 2008. Available to players outside a bar in the 1990s as NTN Trivia on Sierra's, prime before its time, online gaming network, Imagination Network (INN) where INN players competed against all other players globally and made rankings, etc like those playing at bar locations, but without the boozing. INN went defunct after its buyout by ATT. Typically, independently owned bars and restaurants offer Buzztime.  It is, however, offered by each outlet of two major U.S. chains, Buffalo Wild Wings and Damon's Grill. As of August 2021, Buffalo Wild Wings only carries Buzztime in 7 U.S. locations in 5 different states. It is also carried at limited T.G.I. Friday's and Applebee's locations.  Buzztime offers several different kinds of trivia games based on a variety of subjects, including pop culture, entertainment, world history, geography, sports and music, as well as general trivia games with questions in many categories.

NTN Buzztime, Inc. is based in Carlsbad, California.  The company was founded as Alroy Industries and formerly went by the name NTN Communications, Inc. from 1985 to 2005.

Other products
NTN Buzztime used to produce a variety of wireless paging products, the most common example being a device that vibrates when a food order is ready.  The wireless product division was sold in 2006.

NTN Buzztime also once produced and distributed ProHost Seating and Reservations Software for managing door and floor operations in Restaurants, Casinos, Theme Parks, Hotels, in its Arlington, TX office-  known as "Software Solutions".  Signature customers include Harrah's Entertainment, MGM Mirage, Universal Studios and Hard Rock Cafe.  The software solutions division was sold by NTN Buzztime, Inc. in 2007 to ESP Digital Media.

Lawsuits
In 1997, a complaint was filed charging NTN for devising an "exit strategy" that would provide certain defendants with millions of dollars of compensation upon their resignation. In 2000, a settlement of $3,250,000 was approved.

In January 2008, the company filed a legal suit, in the Southern District of California against Sony Computer Entertainment Europe, alleging that Sony had violated several of its trademarks. The suit accused Sony of a "malicious, fraudulent, knowing, wilful, and deliberate" violation of its trademarks. In the suit, Buzztime sought the recall and destruction of all infringing products and asked the court for actual damages, punitive damages, legal fees and an order to the US Patent and Trademark Office not to register Sony's then pending Buzz! trademarks. The case was eventually settled out of court in favor of Sony.

Notes and references

External links 
 NTN Buzztime corporate website

Companies listed on NYSE American
Quiz games
Video game companies of the United States
Companies based in San Diego
Video game companies established in 1983
Companies based in Carlsbad, California